Emanuele Basile (July 2, 1949 – May 4, 1980) was an Italian captain of the Carabinieri and a collaborator of Paolo Borsellino on anti-Mafia investigations. He was killed by Cosa Nostra in Monreale, Palermo, shot repeatedly in the back whilst he carried his four-year-old daughter, who was unhurt in the shooting. He was working with Borsellino on traffic of heroin and killings related to Mafia in Corleone at the time of his death. The investigation on his murder was headed by Borsellino.

The hit team was made up by Vincenzo Puccio, Armando Bonanno and Giuseppe Madonia of the Resuttana Mafia family, with logistical support from Giovanni Brusca.

On 14 November 1992, Salvatore Riina and Francesco Madonia were sentenced to life imprisonment for the murder.

References

Sources 
 http://digilander.libero.it/inmemoria/borsellino_biografia.htm
 http://digilander.libero.it/inmemoria/delitti_della_mafia.htm
 https://web.archive.org/web/20051226100445/http://www.testimonideltempo.it/contenuti/paoloborsellino.asp
 https://web.archive.org/web/20051122195846/http://www.frosinone.org/oltreloccidente/testi_oo/f302_stille.htm

1949 births
1980 deaths
People murdered by the Sicilian Mafia
People from Taranto
Carabinieri
Deaths by firearm in Italy
Male murder victims
Italian police officers
People murdered in Italy